Anna-Kaisa Ikonen (born 4 April 1977) is a Finnish politician currently serving in the Parliament of Finland representing the National Coalition Party from the Pirkanmaa constituency. She served as the Mayor of Tampere between 2013 and 2017 and won the city council election in 2021.

References

1977 births
Living people
Politicians from Tampere
National Coalition Party politicians
Members of the Parliament of Finland (2019–23)
21st-century Finnish women politicians
Women members of the Parliament of Finland